Knefastia lindae is an extinct species of sea snail, a marine gastropod mollusk in the family Pseudomelatomidae, the turrids and allies.

Description
The length of the shell attains 47.5 mm.

Distribution
This extinct marine species was found in Pliocene strata of Florida, USA; age range: 3.6 to 0.781 Ma.

References

 Petuch, Edward J. Atlas of Florida Fossil Shells:(pliocene and Pleistocene Marine Gastopods). Chicago Spectrum Press, 1994.
 B. Landau and C. Marques da Silva. 2010. Early Pliocene gastropods of Cubagua, Venezuela: Taxonomy, palaeobiogeography and ecostratigraphy. Palaeontos 19:1-221

External links
 Fossilworks: Knefastia lindae

lindae
Gastropods described in 1994
Pliocene gastropods